Oakwood Mall (Enid, Oklahoma)
Oakwood Mall (Eau Claire, Wisconsin)
Oakwood Center, a shopping mall in Gretna, Louisiana